One Fine Day is a 1996 American romantic comedy-drama film directed by Michael Hoffman, starring Michelle Pfeiffer and George Clooney as two single working parents, with Alex D. Linz and Mae Whitman as their children. The title comes from the 1963 song "One Fine Day" by The Chiffons, which is heard in the film.

Michelle Pfeiffer served as an executive producer on the film, which was made in association with her company Via Rosa Productions.

The film was nominated for an Oscar for Best Original Song ("For the First Time").

Plot
Melanie Parker is an architect and divorced mother to her son, Sammy. Her day gets off to a bad start when she is late to drop him off at school, due to the forgetfulness of fellow divorced father Jack Taylor, a New York Daily News reporter whose daughter, Maggie, is thrust into his care that morning by his former wife who leaves to go on her honeymoon with her new husband. The children arrive just a moment too late to go on a school field trip (a Circle Line boat cruise). Their parents realize that, on top of hectically busy schedules, they must work together that day to supervise the children. In the confusion of sharing a taxi, they accidentally switch cell phones, causing each of them, all morning, to receive calls intended for the other one, which they then have to relay to the other person.

Melanie must make an architectural design presentation to an important client. Jack has to find a source for a scoop on the New York mayor's mob connections. Sammy causes havoc at Melanie's office with toy cars, causing her to trip and break her scale model display. In frustration, she takes him to a day care center (which is having a "Superhero Day"), where she coincidentally comes across Jack trying to convince Maggie to stay and behave herself. They create impromptu costumes for the children, using his imagination and her resourcefulness. She takes her model to a shop to get it quickly repaired. Having left for a meeting, she panics when she receives a phone call from Sammy about another child having a psychedelic drug. She phones Jack in desperation and asks him to pick up the children. He agrees, on the condition that she take over their care at 3:15 while he chases down a potential news source.

While in Melanie's care, Maggie goes missing from a store, and wanders some distance down a crowded midtown sidewalk. Melanie breaks down in despair at the police station, files a missing child report, and then goes to a mayoral press conference to find Jack. He is notified by the police that Maggie has been found, and makes it to the press conference just barely in time to confront the mayor with his scoop about corruption. He had earlier tracked down its source, just as she was leaving a beauty salon in a limousine. Although they have been antagonistic, Melanie and Jack work together to get the children, by taxi, to a soccer game. She insists that she will have time first to do her presentation to the new clients, despite him protesting that it will make them late for the game. She begins her pitch over drinks at the 21 Club lounge, but upon seeing Sammy in high spirits, she realizes that she cares more about him than her job. Insisting that she must leave immediately to be with him, she fully expects to be fired, but the clients are impressed.

At the game, Melanie meets her former husband, Eddie, who is a musician and who admits that he lied to Sammy about taking him fishing in the summer and that he will be going on tour as a drummer with Bruce Springsteen instead. That evening, Jack wants a reason to visit Melanie's apartment, so he takes Maggie to buy goldfish to replace the ones that were eaten earlier in the day by a cat. At Melanie's apartment, the children watch The Wizard of Oz while she and Jack share a first kiss. She goes to the bathroom to freshen up; when she returns, an exhausted Jack is asleep on the sofa. She joins him and they fall asleep together, with the children happily observing.

Cast

 Michelle Pfeiffer as Melanie Parker
 George Clooney as Jack Taylor
 Alex D. Linz as Sammy Parker
 Mae Whitman as Maggie Taylor
 Charles Durning as Lew
 Jon Robin Baitz as Mr. Yates Jr.
 Ellen Greene as Mrs. Elaine Lieberman
 Joe Grifasi as Manny Feldstein
 Pete Hamill as Frank Burroughs
 Anna Maria Horsford as Evelyn
 Gregory Jbara as Freddy
 Sheila Kelley as Kristen
 Barry Kivel as Mr. Yates Sr.
 Robert Klein as Dr. Martin
 George N. Martin as Mr. Smith Leland
 Michael Massee as Eddie Parker
 Amanda Peet as Celia
 Holland Taylor as Rita
 Rachel York as Liza
 Marianne Muellerleile as Ruta
 Sidney Armus as Mayor Sidney Aikens

Production
Clooney's character did not exist in the script's original draft. Producer Lynda Obst explained the change: "We were being incredibly sexist. There are plenty of divorced, single working fathers going through the exact same thing." The studios initially wanted Kevin Costner or Tom Cruise to portray Jack Taylor but they passed and Clooney ultimately received the part. The film was shot in 44 Manhattan locations.

Reception

Critical response
Rotten Tomatoes gave the film a 53% approval rating based on reviews from 36 critics, with an average rating of 5.9/10. The consensus summarizes: "With a throwback 1930s vibe, this screwball romantic comedy is perfect for One Fine Day of folding laundry." It was considered a commercial disappointment by Twentieth Century Fox.

Janet Maslin in The New York Times wrote: "A 50's romp with a few glaring 90's touches (dueling cellular phones, frazzled single parents), One Fine Day makes for sunny, pleasant fluff. Both stars are enjoyably breezy, and there's enough chemistry to deflect attention from the story's endless contrivances... he's [Clooney] such a natural as a movie star that he hardly needs false flattery. Ms Pfeiffer, meanwhile, shows a flair for physical comedy."

Roger Ebert in the Chicago Sun-Times wrote: "'Cinema is the history of boys photographing girls.' Or so Jean-Luc Godard is claimed to have said. I thought of his words while watching One Fine Day, an uninspired formula movie with another fine performance by Michelle Pfeiffer. She does everything in this movie that a much better movie would have required from her, but the screenplay lets her down... Pfeiffer looks, acts and sounds wonderful throughout all of this, and George Clooney is perfectly serviceable as a romantic lead, sort of a Mel Gibson lite. I liked them. I wanted them to get together. I wanted them to live happily ever after. The sooner the better."

Rita Kempley in The Washington Post wrote: "Director Michael Hoffman, whose idiosyncratic portfolio includes the period comedy Restoration and the spoof Soapdish, sets a mellow pace and alternates old-fashioned split screen with crosscutting to enliven the many phone scenes. If the stars don't click, of course, nothing else matters. Happily, Pfeiffer and Clooney, now officially a movie star, not only click, they send off sparks."

Kenneth Turan in the Los Angeles Times wrote: "One Fine Day is fortunate in its casting. Not only does it have Michelle Pfeiffer, whose gift for this kind of business was visible as far back as Married to the Mob and The Fabulous Baker Boys, but it marks the emergence of George Clooney as a major romantic star... Still, despite feeling like its moments have been micro-managed for maximum audience response, One Fine Day often passes for a pleasant diversion. But with actors so suited to each other, it's too bad the film didn't give them more original material to work with."

Edward Guthmann in the San Francisco Chronicle wrote: "We've seen it before, but Pfeiffer and Clooney do everything in their power to make it seem fresh and delightful. That's ultimately not enough, and even though the stars have some chemistry and Pfeiffer delivers her usual spotless performance, One Fine Day never manages to be more than a harmless, forgettable time-filler."

Rob Nelson in the Boston Phoenix wrote: "Privilege and coincidence have always been central to screwball comedy, but the speed of crosstown travel here rivals Die Hard 3 for plausibility. And it's these convenient shortcuts that waylay the film from examining the condition it purports to critique: that is, the '90s compulsion to drive at full throttle."

Accolades

The film is recognized by American Film Institute in these lists:
 2002: AFI's 100 Years...100 Passions – Nominated

Music

One Fine Day: Music From The Motion Picture is the soundtrack for the film. The album peaked at # 57 on The Billboard 200 in 1997.

Track listing

Certifications

References

External links
 
 
 

1996 films
1996 comedy-drama films
1996 romantic comedy films
1996 romantic drama films
1990s English-language films
1996 romantic comedy-drama films
1990s Spanish-language films
20th Century Fox films
American romantic comedy-drama films
Films about father–daughter relationships
Films about families
Films directed by Michael Hoffman
Films produced by Lynda Obst
Films scored by James Newton Howard
Films set in New York City
Films shot in New York City
Films about mother–son relationships
1990s American films